Nick Slyney (born 2 November 1988) is an Australian former rugby league footballer who played in the 2000s and 2010s.

Background
Slyney was born in Atherton, Queensland, Australia.

Playing career
Slyney made his NRL début for North Queensland in round 13 of the 2008 NRL season against the Wests Tigers, and played three NRL matches that season. He subsequently played for the Redcliffe Dolphins in the Queensland Cup, and midway through the 2011 season, signed to return to the NRL to play for the Brisbane Broncos.

In 2012, Slyney was named in the Queensland Residents side.

On 19 June 2014, Slyney signed a two-year contract extension with the London Broncos keeping him at the Broncos until the end of 2016.

References

1988 births
Australian people of English descent
Australian rugby league players
Brisbane Broncos players
Living people
London Broncos captains
London Broncos players
North Queensland Cowboys players
Northern Pride RLFC players
Redcliffe Dolphins players
Rugby league locks
Rugby league players from Queensland
Rugby league props
Rugby league second-rows